Buddleja (Buddleia; also historically given as Buddlea) is a genus comprising over 140 species of flowering plants endemic to Asia, Africa, and the Americas. The generic name bestowed by Linnaeus posthumously honoured the Reverend Adam Buddle (1662–1715), an English botanist and rector, at the suggestion of Dr. William Houstoun. Houstoun sent the first plants to become known to science as buddleja (B. americana) to England from the Caribbean about 15 years after Buddle's death.  Buddleja species, especially Buddleja davidii and interspecific hybrids, are commonly known as butterfly bushes and are frequently cultivated as garden shrubs.

Nomenclature
The botanic name has been the source of some confusion. By modern practice of botanical Latin, the spelling of a generic name made from 'Buddle' would be Buddleia, but Linnaeus in his Species Plantarum of 1753 and 1754 spelled it Buddleja, with the long i between two vowels, common in early modern orthography. The pronunciation of the long i in Buddleja as j is a common modern error. The International Code of Botanical Nomenclature has gradually changed to incorporate stricter rules about orthographic variants and as of the 2006 edition requires (article 60, particularly 60.5) that Linnaeus' spelling should be followed in this case.

Classification
The genus Buddleja is now included in Scrophulariaceae, having earlier been classified under Buddlejaceae (synonym: Oftiaceae) and Loganiaceae

Description
Both evergreen and deciduous species occur, in tropical and temperate regions respectively.

The colour of the flowers varies widely, from mostly pastel pinks and blues in Asia, to vibrant yellows and reds in the New World, while many cultivars have deeper tones. The flowers are generally rich in nectar and often strongly honey-scented.

Distribution
The genus is found in four continents. Over 60 species are native through the New World from the southern United States south to Chile, while many other species are found in the Old World, in Africa, and parts of Asia, but all are absent as natives from Europe and Australasia. The species are divided into three groups based on their floral type: those in the New World are mostly dioecious (occasionally hermaphrodite or trioecious), while those in the Old World are exclusively hermaphrodite with perfect flowers.

Cultivation and uses
As garden shrubs, buddlejas are essentially 20th-century plants, with the exception of B. globosa which was introduced to Britain from southern Chile in 1774 and disseminated from the nursery of Lee and Kennedy, Hammersmith. Several species are popular garden plants and are commonly known as "butterfly bushes", owing to their attractiveness to butterflies, and have become staples of the modern butterfly garden; they are also attractive to bees and moths.

The most popular cultivated species is Buddleja davidii from central China, named for the French Basque missionary and naturalist Père Armand David. Other common garden species include the aforementioned B. globosa, grown for its strongly honey-scented orange globular inflorescences, and the weeping Buddleja alternifolia. Several interspecific hybrids have been made, notably B. 'Lochinch' (B. davidii × B. fallowiana) and B. × weyeriana (B. globosa × B. davidii), the latter a cross between a South American and an Asiatic species.

Some species commonly escape from the garden. B. davidii in particular is an extensive coloniser of dry open ground. In urban areas in the United Kingdom, it often self-sows on waste ground or old masonry, where it grows into a dense thicket. A number of agricultural organizations and governing authorities throughout the world have designated the plant as an invasive species or a noxious weed. It is frequently seen in the United Kingdom beside railway lines, on the sites of derelict factories and other buildings and, in the aftermath of World War II, on urban bomb sites. That earned it the popular nickname of "the bomb site plant".

Popular garden cultivars include 'Royal Red' (reddish-purple flowers), 'Black Knight' (very dark purple), 'Sungold' (golden yellow), and 'Pink Delight' (pure pink). In recent years, much breeding work has been undertaken to create seed sterile cultivars (see Non-invasive Buddleja cultivars). This is a particularly important consideration in the United States, where several states have banned B. davidii and its fertile cultivars because of their invasiveness.

Buddleja collections
In Britain, there are four National Council for the Conservation of Plants and Gardens collections, held by:
The Lavender Garden, Ashcroft Nurseries, Kingscote, Tetbury, Glos. GL8 8YF. Tel. 01453 860356 www.thelavenderg.co.uk
Longstock Park Nursery, Longstock, Stockbridge, Hants. SO20 6EH. Tel. 01264 810894 www.longstocknursery.co.uk
Paignton Zoo, Totnes Road, Paignton, Devon TQ4 7EU. Tel. 01803 697529 www.paigntonzoo.org.uk
The Shapcott Barton Estate, East Knowstone, South Molton, Devon EX36 4EE. Tel. 01398 341664

List of Buddleja species and naturally occurring hybrids
The many species of Buddleja have been the subject of much taxonomic contention. The listing below includes the names, still prevalent in horticulture, of many former Asiatic species sunk by the late Toon Leeuwenberg as Buddleja crispa and adopted as such in the definitive Flora of China.

 Buddleja acuminata Poir.
 Buddleja agathosma Diels
 Buddleja alata Rehder & E.H.Wilson
 Buddleja albiflora Hemsl.
 Buddleja alternifolia Maxim.
 Buddleja americana L.
 Buddleja anchoensis Kuntze
 Buddleja araucana Phil.
 Buddleja aromatica Rémy
 Buddleja asiatica Lour.
 Buddleja auriculata Benth.
 Buddleja axillaris Willd. ex. Roem. et Schult.
 Buddleja bhutanica T. Yamaz.
 Buddleja blattaria J. F. Macbr.
 Buddleja brachiata Cham. & Schltdl.
 Buddleja brachystachya Diels.
 Buddleja bullata Kunth
 Buddleja candida Dunn
 Buddleja cardanesii Standl. ex E. M. Norman
 Buddleja caryopteridifolia W.W. Sm.
 Buddleja cestriflora Cham.
 Buddleja chapalana B. L. Rob.
 Buddleja chenopodiifolia Kraenzl.
 Buddleja colvilei Hook.f. & Thomson
 Buddleja cordata Kunth
 Buddleja cordobensis Griseb.
 Buddleja coriacea J.Rémy
 Buddleja corrugata M. E. Jones
 Buddleja crispa Benth.
 Buddleja crotonoides A. Gray
 Buddleja cuneata Cham.
 Buddleja curviflora Hook. & Arn.
 Buddleja cuspidata Baker
 Buddleja davidii Franch. (Butterfly bush)
 Buddleja delavayi Gagnep.
 Buddleja diffusa Ruíz & Pav.
 Buddleja domingensis Urb.
 Buddleja dysophylla (Benth.) Radlk.
 Buddleja euryphylla Standl. & Steyerm.
 Buddleja fallowiana Balf.f. & W.W.Sm.
 var. alba Sabourin
 Buddleja farreri Balf.f & W. W. Sm. 
 Buddleja filibracteolata J. A. González & J. F. Morales
 Buddleja forrestii Diels
 Buddleja fragifera Leeuwenb.
 Buddleja fusca Baker
 Buddleja globosa Hope
 Buddleja glomerata H. L. Wendl.
 Buddleja grandiflora Cham. & Schltdl.
 Buddleja hatschbachii E. M. Norman & L. B. Sm.
 Buddleja hieronymi R. E. Fr.
 Buddleja ibarrensis E. M. Norman
 Buddleja incana Ruiz & Pav.
 Buddleja indica Lam.
 Buddleja interrupta Kunth.
 Buddleja iresinoides (Griseb.) Hosseus
 Buddleja jamesonii Benth.
 Buddleja japonica Hemsl.
 Buddleja jinsixiaensis R. B Zhu
 Buddleja kleinii E. M. Norman & L. B. Sm.
 Buddleja lanata Benth.
 Buddleja limitanea W. W. Sm.
 Buddleja lindleyana Fortune ex Lindl.
 Buddleja lojensis E. M. Norman
 Buddleja longifolia Kunth.
 Buddleja longiflora Brade
 Buddleja loricata Leeuwenb.
 Buddleja macrostachya Wallich ex. Benth.
 Buddleja madagascariensis Lam.
 Buddleja marrubiifolia Benth.
 Buddleja megalocephala Donn. Sm.
 Buddleja mendozensis Gillies ex. Benth.
 Buddleja microstachya  E. D. Liu
 Buddleja misionum Kraenzl.
 Buddleja montana Britton
 Buddleja myriantha Diels.
 Buddleja nitida Benth.
 Buddleja nivea Duthie
 Buddleja oblonga Benth.
 Buddleja officinalis Maxim.
 Buddleja paniculata Wallich.
 Buddleja parviflora Kunth
 Buddleja perfoliata Kunth
 Buddleja pichinchensis Kunth
 Buddleja polycephala Kunth
 Buddleja polystachya Fresen.
 Buddleja pulchella N. E. Br.
 Buddleja racemosa Torr.
 Buddleja ramboi L. B. Sm.
 Buddleja rufescens Willd. ex Schultes & Schultes
 Buddleja saligna Willd.
 Buddleja salviifolia (L.) Lam.
 Buddleja scordioides Kunth
 Buddleja sessiliflora Kunth
 Buddleja skutchii C. V. Morton
 Buddleja simplex Kraenzl.
 Buddleja soratae Kraenzl.
 Buddleja speciosissima Taub.
 Buddleja sphaerocalyx Baker
 Buddleja stachyoides Cham & Schltdl.
 Buddleja stenostachya Rehder & E.H.Wilson
 Buddleja sterniana A. D. Cotton
 Buddleja suaveolens Kunth & Bouché
 Buddleja subcapitata E. D. Liu
 Buddleja tibetica W. W. Sm.
 Buddleja thyrsoides Lam.
 Buddleja tubiflora Benth.
 Buddleja tucumanensis Griseb.
 Buddleja utahensis Coville
 Buddleja vexans Kraenzl. & Loes. ex E. M. Norman
 Buddleja × wardii C.Marquand
 Buddleja yunnanensis Gagnep.

Formerly placed here 
 Cephalanthus glabratus (Spreng.) K.Schum. (as B. glabrata Spreng.)

Gallery

RHS Award of Garden Merit
The following Buddleja species and cultivars are (2017) holders of the Royal Horticultural Society's Award of Garden Merit:

B. alternifolia
B. asiatica
B. davidii 'Black Knight'
B. davidii 'Blue Horizon'
B. davidii 'Camkeep' = 
B. davidii 'Darent Valley'
B. davidii 'Dartmoor'
B. davidii 'Monum' = 
B. davidii 'Monite' = 
B. davidii 'Royal Red'
B. davidii 'White Profusion'
B. fallowiana var. alba
B. globosa
B. 'Lochinch'
B. madagascariensis
B. 'Miss Ruby'
B. officinalis
B. 'Pink Delight'
B. 'West Hill'
B. × weyeriana 'Sungold'

See also 
List of Lepidoptera whose larvae feed on Buddleja

Monographs

Asiatic and African species 
Leeuwenberg, A. J. M. (1979) The Loganiaceae of Africa XVIII Buddleja L. II, Revision of the African & Asiatic species. H. Veenman & Zonen, Wageningen, Nederland.

North and South American species 
Norman, E. (2000). Buddlejaceae. Flora Neotropica, Vol. 81. New York Botanical Garden, USA.

Cultivated species and cultivars 
Stuart, D. (2006). Buddlejas. RHS Plant Collector Guide. Timber Press, Oregon, USA.

References

External links

Buddleja globosa pictures from Chilebosque.
Reference to nomenclature issue

 
Butterfly food plants
Scrophulariaceae genera